Tauala is a genus of jumping spiders that was first described by F. R. Wanless in 1988. The name "Tauala" is an arbitrary combination of letters.

Species
 it contains thirteen species, found only in Taiwan and Queensland:
Tauala alveolatus Wanless, 1988 – Australia (Queensland)
Tauala athertonensis Gardzinska, 1996 – Australia (Queensland)
Tauala australiensis Wanless, 1988 – Australia (Queensland)
Tauala bilobatus Żabka & Patoleta, 2015 – Australia (Queensland)
Tauala daviesae Wanless, 1988 – Australia (Queensland)
Tauala elongata Peng & Li, 2002 – Taiwan
Tauala lepidus Wanless, 1988 (type) – Australia (Queensland)
Tauala minutus Wanless, 1988 – Australia (Queensland)
Tauala ottoi Żabka & Patoleta, 2015 – Australia (Queensland)
Tauala palumaensis Żabka & Patoleta, 2015 – Australia (Queensland)
Tauala setosus Żabka & Patoleta, 2015 – Australia (Queensland)
Tauala splendidus Wanless, 1988 – Australia (Queensland)
Tauala zborowskii Żabka & Patoleta, 2015 – Australia (Queensland)

References

Salticidae genera
Salticidae
Spiders of Australia
Spiders of Taiwan